Dock180, (Dedicator of cytokinesis) also known as DOCK1, is a large (~180 kDa) protein involved in intracellular signalling networks. It is the mammalian ortholog of the C. elegans protein CED-5 and belongs to the DOCK family of Guanine nucleotide exchange factors (GEFs).

Discovery
Dock180 was identified, using a far-western blotting approach, as a binding partner of the adaptor protein Crk that was able to induce morphological changes in 3T3 fibroblasts. Subsequently it was reported that Dock180 was able to activate the small GTP-binding protein (G protein) Rac1 and this was later shown to happen via its ability to act as a GEF.

Structure and function
Dock180 is part of a large class of proteins (GEFs) which contribute to cellular signalling events by activating small G proteins. In their resting state G proteins are bound to Guanosine diphosphate (GDP) and their activation requires the dissociation of GDP and binding of guanosine triphosphate (GTP). GEFs activate G proteins by promoting this nucleotide exchange.

Dock180 and related proteins differ from other GEFs in that they do not possess the canonical structure of tandem DH-PH domains known to elicit nucleotide exchange. Instead they possess a DHR2 domain which mediates Rac activation by stabilising it in its nucleotide-free state. Dock180-related proteins also possess a DHR1 domain which has been shown, in vitro, to bind phospholipids and which may be involved in their interaction with cellular membranes. Other structural features of Dock180 include an N-terminal SH3 domain involved in binding to ELMO proteins (see below) and a C-terminal proline-rich region which, in Myoblast city (the Drosophila melanogaster ortholog of Dock180), was shown to bind DCrk (the Drosophila ortholog of Crk).

Regulation of Dock180 Activity
Under physiological conditions Dock180 alone is inefficient at promoting nucleotide exchange on Rac. Effective GEF activity requires an interaction between Dock180 and its binding partner ELMO. ELMO1 is the most comprehensively described isoform of this small family of non-catalytically active proteins which function to recruit Dock180 to the plasma membrane and induce conformational changes which increase GEF efficiency. ELMO1 has also been reported to inhibit ubiqitinylation of Dock180 and so prevent its degradation by proteasomes. Receptor-mediated activation of RhoG (a small G protein of the Rac subfamily) is perhaps the best known inducer of Dock180 GEF activity. Active (GTP-bound) RhoG recruits the ELMO/Dock180 complex to the plasma membrane thereby bringing Dock180 into contact with its substrate, Rac. In tumour cells Dock180 is regulated by a complex containing Crk and p130Cas which is in turn regulated by cooperative signalling by β3-containing integrin complexes and the membrane-bound protein uPAR.

Signalling Downstream of Dock180
Dock180 is a Rac-specific GEF and so is responsible for a subset of Rac-specific signalling events. These include cell migration and phagocytosis of apoptotic cells in C. elegans, neurite outgrowth in PC12 cells and myoblast fusion in the Zebrafish embryo. More recently the DHR1 domain of Dock180 was shown to bind SNX5 (a sorting nexin) and this interaction promoted retrograde transport of the cation-independent mannose 6-phosphate receptor to the Trans-Golgi Network in a Rac-independent manner. Increased expression of Dock180 and Elmo has been reported to contribute to glioma invasion.

Interactions 

Dock180 has been shown to interact with:
 BCAR1, 
 CRK 
 ELMO1, and
 Grb2.

References

Further reading

External links
 
DOCK180 Info with links in the Cell Migration Gateway